Senator Huff may refer to:

Bob Huff (born 1953), California State Senate
Gene Huff (1929–2011), Kentucky State Senate
George Franklin Huff (1842–1912), Pennsylvania State Senate

See also
Senator Hough (disambiguation)